Diane Louise Augustine de Polignac (1746 – 1818), was a French aristocrat, writer and courtier, and a lady-in-waiting to Princess Élisabeth of France.

Biography
She was the daughter of Louis Héracle Armand, marquis de Polignac and Diane Adélaïde Zéphirine de Mancini, and never married; through her brother Jules, 1st Duke of Polignac, she was the sister-in-law to Yolande de Polastron. She had been introduced at court during the reign of Louis XV, served as reader and as lady-in-waiting to the countess of Artois in 1774-78, and to Princess Élisabeth of France from 1778 until 1789. 
She was described as shy but clever and with a sarcastic wit; she was not liked by queen Marie Antoinette herself, but she was described as a driving force within the so-called "Polignac Clan", who exerted so many advantages through her sister-in-law's position as a favorite of the queen.  

She emigrated with the rest of the Polignac family after the outbreak of the French revolution in 1789.

Cultural references
Diane de Polignac is the main character of the novel Les Adieux à la reine by Chantal Thomas (2002).

Works
 Diane de Polignac, Journal d'Italie et de Suisse, Paris, 1789 
 Diane de Polignac, Mémoires sur la vie de la duchesse de Polignac, Piccadilly, 1796

References 

 Jeanne-Louise-Henriette Campan, Mémoire sur la vie privée de Marie-Antoinette, reine de France et de Navarre, t. I, 1823

Diane
French ladies-in-waiting
1746 births
1818 deaths
18th-century French writers
18th-century French women writers